"Oh How the Years Go By" is a song written by Simon Climie and Will Jennings. It was originally included on Climie's debut solo album Soul Inspiration in 1992 and released as a single in 1993, but failed to chart.

Cover versions

Amy Grant cover

Shortly after its initial release, singer-songwriter Amy Grant covered the song and included it on her 1994 album House of Love. It was the sixth release from that album.

 Original album version (5:15), available on the House of Love album
 Radio edit, available on the single with an audio introduction
 Original album version with audio introduction, available on the single
 Live version (4:35), available on the Time Again... Amy Grant Live album

Vanessa Williams cover

In 1996, the song was covered by actress-singer Vanessa Williams and included on the Polygram various artist compilation album NBA at 50 - A Musical Celebration. It was later included on her 1997 studio album Next and released as a single. Her version went to number 6 on the Billboard Adult Contemporary chart.

Charts

Weekly charts

Year-end charts

References

External links
Vanessa Williams Sings Oh How the Years Go By - Miss America 2016, September 13, 2015

Amy Grant songs
Vanessa Williams songs
Songs with lyrics by Will Jennings
Songs written by Simon Climie